Southern Newspapers Inc. (SNI) is a  publishing holding company headquartered in Houston, Texas. The company was founded as Southern Newspapers, Inc., of Tennessee in 1967 by Carmage Walls. Its flagship paper, the Galveston County Daily News is the oldest newspaper in Texas, founded in 1842.

Publications
The company owns several publications, primarily in Texas.

Current publications

 Bay City Tribune (1845) , Bay City, Texas
 Baytown Sun (1949) , Baytown, Texas
 Brazosport Facts (1913) , Brazoria County, Texas
 The Daily Sentinel (1899) , Nacogdoches, Texas
 Fort Payne Times-Journal , Fort Payne, Alabama
 The Galveston County Daily News (1842) , Galveston, Texas
 Kerrville Daily Times (1908) , Kerrville, Texas
 The Lawton Constitution (1904) , Lawton, Oklahoma
 Lufkin Daily News (1906) , Lufkin, Texas
 New Braunfels Herald-Zeitung (1852) , New Braunfels, Texas
 The Paris News (1869) , Paris, Texas
 Sand Mountain Reporter , Albertville, Alabama
 Scottsboro Daily Sentinel , Scottsboro, Alabama
 Seguin Gazette (1888) , Seguin, Texas
 Sulphur Springs News-Telegram , Sulphur Springs, Texas
 Walton Tribune , Monroe, Georgia

Defunct publications

Angleton Times (1893–2004) - absorbed by the Brazosport Facts
Del Rio News-Herald (1929–2020)  - discontinued 
Texas City Sun (1912–2004) - absorbed by the Galveston County Daily News
 Weekly Post (1986–2010) - absorbed by sister paper, the Fort Payne Times-Journal.

External links

 Texas Digital Newspaper Program

References

Galveston County Daily News: Lufkin, Nacogdoches newspapers join SNI family

Publishing companies established in 1967
Newspaper companies of the United States
Companies based in Houston
1967 establishments in Tennessee